The 2019 Sun Bowl was a college football bowl game played on December 31, 2019, with kickoff at 2:00 p.m. EST (12:00 p.m. local MST) on CBS. It was the 86th edition of the Sun Bowl, and was one of the 2019–20 bowl games concluding the 2019 FBS football season. Sponsored by Kellogg's Frosted Flakes breakfast cereal, the game was officially known as the Tony the Tiger Sun Bowl, after its mascot, Tony the Tiger.

Teams
The game was played between the Arizona State Sun Devils from the Pac-12 Conference and the Florida State Seminoles from Atlantic Coast Conference (ACC). This was the fifth overall meeting and second postseason meeting between the programs; Florida State entered the game leading the all-time series, 3–1. Arizona State's lone victory in the series came in their home stadium in the inaugural Fiesta Bowl. The teams' most recent prior meeting was in 1984.

Arizona State Sun Devils

Arizona State entered the game with a 7–5 record (4–5 in conference). They finished tied for third place in the South Division of the Pac-12. The Sun Devils were 3–1 against ranked opponents, defeating Michigan State, California, and Oregon while losing to Utah. They started their season 5–1, then lost four in a row before finishing the regular season with two wins. This was Arizona State's seventh Sun Bowl; the Sun Devils are 3–2–1 in prior appearances.

Florida State Seminoles

Florida State entered the game with a 6–6 record (4–4 in conference). They finished in a three-way tie for third place in the ACC's Atlantic Division. The Seminoles lost to all three ranked teams they faced; Virginia, Clemson, and Florida. This was Florida State's third Sun Bowl; in their previous two appearances, their 1954 team lost the 1955 Sun Bowl to Texas Western (now UTEP), 37–14, and their 1966 team lost that season's Sun Bowl to Wyoming, 28–20.

Game summary

Statistics

References

External links

Game statistics at statbroadcast.com

Sun Bowl
Sun Bowl
Sun Bowl
Sun Bowl
Arizona State Sun Devils football bowl games
Florida State Seminoles football bowl games